This is a list of people who have served as Custos Rotulorum of Anglesey.

 Thomas Holte bef. 1544–1546
 Lewis Ab Owen ap Meurig ?–1558
 Sir Richard Bulkeley 1558–1572
 Sir Richard Bulkeley bef. 1577 – bef. 1584
 Robert Dudley, 1st Earl of Leicester bef. 1584–1588
 Sir Richard Bulkeley bef. 1594–1621
 Rowland White 1621–1640
 Sir Arthur Tyringham 1640–1642
 Sir Hugh Owen, 1st Baronet 1642–1643
 John Bodvel 1643–1646
 Interregnum
 Robert Bulkeley, 2nd Viscount Bulkeley 1660–1688
 Nicholas Bagenal 1689–1690
 Richard Bulkeley, 3rd Viscount Bulkeley 1690–1704
 Richard Bulkeley, 4th Viscount Bulkeley 1705–1715
 Owen Meyrick 1715–1759
 Sir Nicholas Bayly, 2nd Baronet 1759–1782
For later custodes rotulorum, see Lord Lieutenant of Anglesey.

References

Institute of Historical Research - Custodes Rotulorum 1544-1646
Institute of Historical Research - Custodes Rotulorum 1660-1828

Anglesey